This is a list of parking authorities in Pennsylvania.

References

Government of Pennsylvania